Lanett Municipal Airport  is a city-owned public-use airport located three nautical miles (6 km) southwest of the central business district of Lanett, a city in Chambers County, Alabama, United States. According to the FAA's National Plan of Integrated Airport Systems for 2009–2013, it is categorized as a general aviation facility.

Facilities and aircraft 
It has one runway designated 8/26 with an asphalt surface measuring 3,148 by 80 feet (960 x 24 m).

In February of 2022, Lanett M.A., opened a 5400 by 90 feet asphalt runway.

For the 12-month period ending February 24, 2010, the airport had 3,290 aircraft operations, an average of 274 per month: 99.7% general aviation and 0.3% military.
At that time there were 13 aircraft based at this airport: 84.6% single-engine, 7.7% multi-engine and 7.7% ultralight.

References

External links 
 Aerial image as of 7 March 1997 from USGS The National Map
 Airfield photos for 7A3 from Civil Air Patrol
 

Airports in Alabama
Transportation buildings and structures in Chambers County, Alabama